Kazuki Nishishita (born 14 October 1981) is a Japanese ski jumper.

In the World Cup he finished twice among the top 10, his highest place being seventh from January 2000 in Sapporo.

External links

References 

1981 births
Living people
Japanese male ski jumpers